The 2017–18 NC State Wolfpack women's basketball team represented North Carolina State University during the 2017–18 NCAA Division I women's basketball season. The Wolfpack, led by fifth-year head coach Wes Moore, played their home games at Reynolds Coliseum and were members of the Atlantic Coast Conference. They finished the season 26–9, 11–5 in ACC play to finish in a tie for fourth place. They advanced to the semifinals of the ACC women's tournament where they lost to Louisville. They received at-large bid of the NCAA women's tournament where they defeated Elon and Maryland in the first and second rounds before losing to Mississippi State in the sweet sixteen.

Roster

Schedule

|-
!colspan=9 style="background:#E00000; color:white;"| Exhibition

|-
!colspan=9 style="background:#E00000; color:white;"| Non-conference regular season

|-
!colspan=9 style="background:#E00000; color:white;"| ACC regular season

|-
!colspan=9 style="background:#E00000; color:white;"| ACC Women's Tournament

|-
!colspan=9 style="background:#E00000; color:white;"| NCAA Women's Tournament

Source

Rankings

References

NC State Wolfpack women's basketball seasons
NC State
NC State